Lauren James (born 29 September 2001) is an English professional footballer who plays as a forward for Women's Super League club Chelsea and the England women's national team.

Club career

Arsenal
James was scouted by Arsenal as a 13-year-old and trained with the boys' team, but within two years she began training with the first team. On 29 September 2017, James made her debut for Arsenal, coming on in the 67th minute, replacing Lisa Evans in a 2–0 win over Everton in the 2017–18 season. In doing so, she became the second-youngest player in Arsenal's history to make their debut.

Manchester United
 
On 13 July 2018, it was announced that James would be part of the first professional Manchester United squad due to compete in the newly restructured 2018–19 FA Women's Championship. She made her competitive debut for Manchester United in a 1–0 League Cup victory against Liverpool, on 19 August. She scored the opening two goals in United's first game of the 2018–19 Championship season, a 12–0 win away to Aston Villa. James was voted FA Women's Championship player of the month for September following her three goals across Manchester United's unbeaten opening month. On 20 April 2019, James scored four goals in a 7–0 league win against Crystal Palace.

James scored United's first ever WSL goal, netting in the 71st minute in a 2–0 win against Liverpool on 28 September 2019. Two weeks later, James was sent off in United's 3–0 league win away to Tottenham Hotspur after receiving two yellow cards. James signed her first professional contract with the club on 16 December. At the end of the 2019–20 season, James finished as United's top scorer and was named to the four player shortlist for PFA Women's Young Player of the Year.

On 27 March 2021, James opened the scoring in a 2–0 league victory over West Ham United. The match was the first FA WSL match to be played at Old Trafford.

Chelsea
On 23 July 2021, James signed a four-year contract with Chelsea. She scored her first goal for the club in a 9-0 away win against Leicester City on 27 March 2022.

International career

Youth
In April 2017, James made her under-17 debut in a 2–0 friendly defeat to USA. On 14 October 2017, she captained England during a 10–0 win over Latvia as part of 2018 UEFA Women's Under-17 Championship qualification, scoring four goals.

In January 2019, James received her first call-up to the under-19 squad for the Algarve Tournament. In July 2019, James was named in the England squad for the 2019 UEFA Under-19 Championship in Scotland.

Senior
In November 2020, James received her first senior national team call-up as part of a 29-player training camp at St George's Park.

James made her senior debut on 3 September 2022, coming on as a 79th minute substitute during England's 2023 World Cup qualification match against Austria. She scored her first international goal on 16 February 2023 during England's 4–0 victory against South Korea in the 2023 Arnold Clark Cup.

Personal life 
James is the younger sister of Chelsea and England defender Reece James. She has cited her father Nigel, a UEFA licensed football coach, as inspiration: "[He] has helped me every step of the way. I grew up playing football with my brothers and wanted to play like them; I have always loved the game. I am grateful to my Dad for all the time, effort and love that he has put into my football by coaching me in order that I reach the very best level." She is of Jamaican descent through her father.

She attended Whitton School in Whitton, London.

Career statistics

Club

International
Statistics accurate as of match played 23 February 2023.

International goals
. England score listed first, score column indicates score after each James goal.

Honours
Manchester United
 FA Women's Championship: 2018–19

Chelsea
 FA Women's Super League: 2021–22

England
Arnold Clark Cup: 2023

Individual

 Women's Super League Goal of the Month: February 2023
 FA Women's Championship Player of the Month: September 2018
 North-West Football Awards Women's Rising Star: 2020
 Arnold Clark Cup NXGN Player of the Tournament: 2023

 Women’s Young Player of the Year at the London Football Awards. March 2023

References

External links

 Profile at the Manchester United F.C. website
 
 

2001 births
Living people
English women's footballers
England women's international footballers
England women's youth international footballers
English sportspeople of Jamaican descent
Women's Super League players
Arsenal W.F.C. players
Manchester United W.F.C. players
Chelsea F.C. Women players
FA Women's National League players
Women's association football forwards